Olearia archeri is a species of flowering plant in the family Asteraceae and is endemic to Tasmania. It is a shrub with small, crowded, narrowly elliptic leaves and white and yellow, daisy-like inflorescences.

Description
Flowering occurs from September to March and the fruit is a brown achene, the pappus with 66–85 bristles.

Taxonomy and naming
Olearia archeri was first formally described in 1989 by Nicholas Sèan Lander in the journal Muelleria from specimens collected by Ann and David Ratkowsky at Cash's lookout on Eaglehawk Neck in 1973. The specific epithet (archeri) honours William Archer.

Distribution and habitat

References

Flora of Tasmania
archeri
Plants described in 1989